Brian Hoven (born November 28, 1941) is a Republican member of the Montana Senate.  He was elected to House District 24 which represents the Great Falls area.

Hoven earned a Bachelor of Science degree from Princeton University. He is a United States Army Reserve veteran. Hoven owns his own business and resides in Great Falls, Montana.

References

Living people
1941 births
Republican Party members of the Montana House of Representatives
Politicians from Great Falls, Montana
Princeton University alumni
21st-century American politicians